Detrick is an unincorporated community in Shenandoah County, Virginia, United States. Detrick lies within Fort Valley at the crossroads of Virginia Secondary Route 678 (Fort Valley Road) and Seven Fountains Road.

Unincorporated communities in Shenandoah County, Virginia
Unincorporated communities in Virginia